Mikael Bengtsson (born December 5, 1981) is a Swedish former association footballer. He played most of his career for the Swedish club Trelleborgs FF. He has also played for Landskrona BoIS for two seasons.

External links 
 
 Profile at Eliteprospects

Swedish footballers
Trelleborgs FF players
Landskrona BoIS players
1981 births
Living people
Allsvenskan players
Superettan players
Association football defenders